Robert Ledger (born in the 1890s in Ripon) was a professional footballer who played as a defender for Huddersfield Town. There is no more information about him after World War I.

Robert Ledger was born circa 1895 in Dipton, England. He joined the league via the amateur club from Mickley, Co Durham. He later joined the Durham Light Infantry faction and survived the war.

1890s births
Year of death missing
People from Ripon
English footballers
Association football defenders
English Football League players
Huddersfield Town A.F.C. players
Sportspeople from Yorkshire
British Army personnel of World War I
Durham Light Infantry soldiers